Mrunal Thakur (born 1 August 1992) is an Indian actress who primarily works in Hindi films along with Telugu and Marathi films. She made her acting debut with the television soap opera Mujhse Kuchh Kehti...Yeh Khamoshiyaan (2012) and had her breakthrough with Kumkum Bhagya (2014–2016). For the latter, she won the ITA Award for Best Actress in a Supporting Role in 2015.

Thakur made her Hindi film debut with Love Sonia (2018), and was next seen in the 2019 biographical films Super 30 and Batla House. Following a series of commercial failures, Thakur gained success with the Telugu romantic drama film Sita Ramam (2022).

Early life
Mrunal Thakur was born on 1 August 1992 in Dhule, Maharashtra. She did her schooling at St. Joseph's Convent School, Jalgaon, and at Vasant Vihar High School, Mumbai. Thakur left KC College before being able to graduate as she was pursuing television at the time.

Career

Television career (2012–2014)

While attending college, Thakur signed a lead role as Gauri Bhosle opposite Mohit Sehgal in the Star Plus series Mujhse Kuchh Kehti...Yeh Khamoshiyaan. The show aired from 2012 to 2013. Later in 2013, Thakur appeared in an episodic appearance on the mystery thriller Har Yug Mein Aayega Ek – Arjun, in which she played a journalist named Sakshi Anand.

In February 2014, Thakur signed Zee TV's soap opera Kumkum Bhagya, for which she began shooting the following month. The show, co-starring Sriti Jha, Shabir Ahluwalia, Arjit Taneja, and Supriya Shukla, started airing on 15 April, and saw Thakur portray Bulbul Arora Khanna, a woman who along with her elder sister (played by Jha) helps their mother (played by Shukla) run a marriage hall. The show received mostly positive to mixed reviews from critics in critical reception. Thakur quit the show in January 2016.

Thakur appeared as a Contestant on Box Cricket League 1 in 2014 and Nach Baliye 7 in 2015. In 2016, she performed dance in a special episode of &TV's SauBhagyalaxmi and had a Guest appearance in Tuyul & Mbak Yul Reborn. Her final appearance on TV was with the Indonesian serial Nadin, where she was seen as Tara, after which she took a retirement from television.

Film career (2014–present) 

Thakur made her film debut with the Marathi film, Vitti Dandu, which was released in 2014. She was seen as Sandhya. Her next Marathi film was Surajya, where she was seen as Dr. Swapna.

In 2012, Thakur began work on her first Hindi project, the international film Love Sonia, for which she stayed at Kolkata. The film was released in September 2018 after various delays and featured her in the titular role of a village girl who brings to light issue of global human trafficking. For preparation, Thakur stayed at a brothel to study the body language of prostitutes. Although the film was generally well reviewed, it was a failure at the domestic box office. 

Thakur's Bollywood debut came in 2019 with Vikas Bahl's biographical drama Super 30, narrating the story of mathematician Anand Kumar (played by Hrithik Roshan in the film) and his educational program of the same name, in which she portrayed Supriya, a classical dancer and Kumar's love interest. It emerged as a commercial success and one of the top-grossing Hindi films of 2019. In the same year, she played John Abraham's wife Nandita Kumar in Nikkhil Advani's Batla House, based on the 2008 Batla House encounter case. It grossed over  worldwide becoming a commercially successful venture.

In 2020, Thakur appeared in a Netflix venture, the four-part anthology horror film Ghost Stories as Ira in the Segment: Karan Johar's segment. The same year she appeared in a music video "Gallan Goriya", alongside John Abraham.

In 2021, Thakur has starred in the sports drama, Toofaan, directed by Rakeysh Omprakash Mehra and co-starring Farhan Akhtar, which premiered on 16 July 2021 on Amazon Prime Video in which her performance was praised. In addition, she co-starred in the action thriller Dhamaka, directed by Ram Madhvani and co-starring Kartik Aaryan and Amruta Subhash, which released on Netflix on 19 November 2021. She also appeared in two music videos in the year 2021, "Bad Boy x Bad Girl" with Badshah and "Aise Na Chhoro" with Guru Randhawa.

Thakur's first film of 2022, Jersey, a remake of the 2019 Telugu film of the same name, co-starring Shahid Kapoor, released on 22 April 2022. The film received mixed-to-positive reviews from critics, praising the performances, direction and soundtrack; however, the film emerged as a commercial failure at the box office. Thakur made her Telugu film debut opposite Dulquer Salmaan in Hanu Raghavapudi's period romantic drama Sita Ramam. The film received positive reviews upon release from critics and audiences alike and emerged as a major blockbuster at the box-office, thus proving to be a breakthrough for her.

Thakur will appear opposite Abhimanyu Dassani and Paresh Rawal in the multi-starrer comedy Aankh Micholi. Following this, she will be seen with Ishaan Khatter in the war action film Pippa. She will also be seen playing the role of a police officer alongside Aditya Roy Kapur in the Hindi remake of the 2019 Tamil film Thadam. She also completed Maddock Films Pooja Meri Jaan alongside Huma Qureshi.

Media image 

The Telegraph finds Thakur to be "honest and heartwarming". Vogue noted, "Watch out for this screen chameleon with a plan." Filmfare noted her "strong screen presence, and surreal beauty". Thakur ranked 8th in Eastern Eyes Top 30 under 30 Global Asian Stars List of 2021. 

Thakur has ramp walked at the Lakme Fashion Week and has been the cover model for several magazines. Thakur is a celebrity endorser for several brands and products, including Lakme and Dulux among others.

Filmography

Films

Television

Music videos

Awards and nominations

References

External links 

 
 

1992 births
Living people
Indian television actresses
Indian film actresses
Marathi people
Actresses in Hindi cinema
Actresses in Hindi television
Actresses in Marathi cinema
Actresses in Telugu cinema
People from Dhule
Actresses from Maharashtra
Indian women